Hydrogen silsesquioxane(s) (HSQ, H-SiOx, THn, H-resin) are inorganic compounds with the empirical formula [HSiO3/2]n. The cubic H8Si8O12 (TH8) is used as the visual representation for HSQ. TH8, TH10, TH12, and TH14 have been characterized by EA), gas chromatography–mass spectroscopy (GC-MS), IR spectroscopy, and NMR spectroscopy .

High purity semiconductor-grade HSQ has been investigated as a negative resist in photolithography and electron-beam (e-beam) lithography.  HSQ is commonly delivered in methyl isobutyl ketone (MIBK) and can be used to form 0.01–2 µm films on substrates/wafers. When exposed to electrons or extreme ultraviolet radiation (EUV), HSQ cross-links via hydrogen evolution concomitant with Si-O bond crosslinking. Sufficiently dosed and exposed regions form a low dielectric constant (low-k) Si rich oxide that is chemically resistant/insoluble towards developers, such as tetramethylammonium hydroxide (TMAH). Sub-10 nm patterning is achievable with HSQ. The nanoscale patterning capabilities and low-k of the Si rich oxide produced is potentially of broad scope of nano applications and devices.

HSQ has been available as 1 and 6% (wt%) MIBK solutions from Dow Inc. (Formally Dow Corning), called XR-1541-001 and XR-1541-006, respectively. HSQ in MIBK has a short shelf life. Alternatively, Applied Quantum Materials Inc. (AQM) produces HSQ with a longer shelf life., AQM HSQ solutions are available in the United States from DisChem, Inc.

Further reading

References

Optical materials